Edirne 25 Kasım Stadium is a football stadium in Edirne, Turkey and is the home ground of the football club Edirnespor. The stadium has an all-seated capacity of 3,500.

References

Sports venues completed in 1950
Buildings and structures in Edirne
Edirnespor
Football venues in Turkey
Tourist attractions in Edirne Province
1950 establishments in Turkey